Expressway S5 or express road S5 is a limited-access road in Poland which has been planned to run along the route Ostróda – Grudziądz – Bydgoszcz – Poznań – Wrocław.

The construction of the road received higher priority after Poland was selected as one of the hosts of the UEFA Euro 2012 championship, since it would serve as a direct connection between three of the four Polish cities hosting matches: Poznań, Wrocław and (in part) Gdańsk. However, plans to finish the whole road before the championships were proven too optimistic and only a section between the A2 motorway and Gniezno was completed by that time. The  section was opened on 4 June 2012. This part of the S5 expressway serves as the eastern bypass of Poznań.

In October 2015, the expressway had been extended from the Nowe Marzy junction (near Grudziądz) to Ostróda.
In November 2015, contracts were signed for the Gniezno-Grudziądz section, a total of about 150 km. In May 2017, the continuation of the S5 from the end of the eastern bypass of Poznań to just north of Gniezno opened to traffic, thus diverting most transit traffic away from Gniezno itself.

Since 2022, the entire main section of S5 from Grudziądz (motorway A1) through Bydgoszcz, Poznań (A2) to Wrocław (A4) is complete and open to traffic.

Exit List

References 

Expressways in Poland
Proposed roads in Poland